Pydna is a former American missile base in Kastellaun, Germany named Wueschheim Air Station.

Nuclear-equipped MGM-1 Matador, MGM-13 Mace, MIM-14 Nike Hercules and BGM-109G Ground Launched Cruise Missiles were stationed here.

It now hosts Nature One, a famous open-air electronic music festival.

Festival facilities now use the same bunkers that were once home to 64 Ground-Launch Cruise Missiles (GLCM) (BGM-109), Tactical Nuclear Missiles, under the operational control of the 38th Tactical Missile Wing of the United States Air Force.

References

External links 

 Pydna
 Wüscheim - Missile Ghost Town
 Site VI - Hundheim 405th Tactical Missile Squadron
 Bilder der Demo 1986
 Entwicklung zur Geschichte der Friedensbewegung im Hunsrück

Former United States military installations in Germany
Installations of the United States Air Force in Germany
Music venues in Germany